Image for Windows is a disk imaging utility for Microsoft Windows developed by TeraByte Unlimited. When first released in 2002, it was one of two disk imaging software products that could create a consistent point-in-time backup of Windows while Windows was running.

The point-in-time technology used by Image for Windows consists of using a special driver, named PHYLock, that effectively redirects data being overwritten by Windows to a holding cache. Since Microsoft's introduction of the Volume Shadow Copy Service (vssvc.exe), this technology concept is now generally available to any Windows based backup software.

Image for Windows supports Windows NT 4.0 and later. It supports both x86 and x64 versions of Windows.

See also
 List of backup software
 List of disk cloning software
 Comparison of disk cloning software
 Comparison of disc image software

References

Further reading
 Jon L. Jacobi, (Aug 11, 2008) Editorial Review of Image for Windows, PC World Downloads
 Frank Ohlhorst (November 24, 2009) The ghost in the machine: 3 disk imaging apps, Computerworld

Windows-only shareware